Roar News is the student newspaper of King's College London. It is editorially independent of both the university and the students' union.

The newspaper was named second-best student publication in the United Kingdom and Ireland by the Student Publication Association in 2022. Furthermore, in 2023 the Student Publication Association named Roar as the best student publication in London. It won six awards in 2015, including Best Publication, Best Website and Best Design. In 2014 it won several others including a Mind Media Award and Student Media of the Year.

Roar has existed in various incarnations since 1973, but in 1992 its name was changed from Casey L to Roar News - named after the university's mascot, Reggie the lion. Roar prints four times a year, spending most of its energy on bringing students and staff up-to-the-minute news online.

Former editors, writers and photographers now work for national news outlets such as The Sun, Press Association, The Independent,  The Daily Mail, Time Out Magazine, The Times, Sky and Thomson Reuters.

History
Roar has existed in various formats, as a magazine, then a tabloid newspaper. It was turned into a full colour, glossy magazine in 2006 but has since been re-branded as a tabloid, borrowing the style of The Sun and The Mirror newspapers in its layout.

It once fell under complete editorial control of the Vice-President Media and Publications, Vice-President Communications and Vice-President Student Media and Engagement, with shifts in the nature of its editorial independence, but in 2010 a student editor was appointed.

The correct version of the newspaper's full name is Roar News, although it is typically shortened to Roar. The newspaper's name has changed the punctuation and style many times over the years which often leads to it wrongly being called 'ROAR', 'ROAR!' or 'Roar!'.

Awards
At the Student Publication Association's 2023 London Regional Awards, Roar was awarded Best Publication. Staff Writer Matteo Cardarelli was awarded Best Journalist and then Editor-in-Chief Ishaan Rahman was given a special mention for Oustanding Commitment. Then Head of Tech Jack Curtis was awarded Highly Commended for Outstanding Commitment. 

Roar was Highly Commended for the Best Publication award at the Student Publication Association's 2022 National Awards. Then-Editor-in-Chief Marino Unger-Verna was also awarded Best Interview for 'The Personal Toll of India's Pandemic'.

At the Student Publication Association's 2021 London Regional Awards, Roar was Highly Commended in the category of Best Publication. Two of the paper's editors were also recognised, with Asher Gibson winning Best Journalist and Marino Unger-Verna being Highly Commended for Outstanding Commitment.

In 2018, Roar picked up a total of five Highly Commended Awards at the Student Publication Association. Nominated in five categories, the paper was commended in all five: Best News Story, Best Multi-Media Journalism Story, Best Newspaper Design, Best Student Photographer and Best Lifestyle Story. The paper also picked up Best Publication in the London Regional Student Publication Awards.

In 2017, Roar won a Highly Commended Award at the Student Publication Association for Best Feature.

Roar picked up six awards at the Student Publication Association in 2015. The paper won Best Publication, Best Website, Best Design and Best Entertainment Piece. It received a highly commended for Best News Story and Best Feature.

Roar's editorial team won the Anna Sargent Student Journalist Award at the Mind Media Awards for outstanding mental health reporting in November 2014.

The newspaper was also shortlisted alongside The Guardian and Cosmopolitan for the non-student award of Best Publication.[4]

Roar won Best Website in the 2014 Student Publication Association awards and received a special recognition for Best Publication.[5]

Alongside KCL Radio, KingsTV and Photosoc, Roar was ranked as one of the top three best student media outlets in the country at the NUS Awards 2014. KCLSU Student Media received runner up in the Student Media of the Year category.[6]

Campaigns
True to its tabloid style, Roar runs traditional tabloid campaigns on matters of student interest. Past campaigns have included:

 Health Schools job cuts (May 2014 – present) Roar came out against university plans to cut 120 jobs in Health Schools in a leader accusing the College of lacking transparency and racing through the redundancy process too quickly.
 London Living Wage (Feb 2014 - March 2014) As part of the campaign, Roar ran an interview with two anonymous King's cleaners who couldn't afford to feed their children on the front page of their February edition. That edition of the paper was taken into the College Council meeting in March, where King's agreed to the London living wage.
 Lord Carey 'homophobic' comments (Nov 2012–Feb 2015) Roar campaigned for the removal of King's alumnus Lord Carey from the Strand Campus windows for controversial comments in opposition to same sex marriage at a Conservative Party conference fringe event in 2012.
 Mental health awareness (Nov 2013–present) Roar produced a special print edition on mental health in November 2013, aiming to raise awareness of mental health among King's students. It included articles such as 'We need racially diverse counsellors' and an interview with King's alumnus Rory Bremner on his ADHD.

References

External links 
 Roars website
 Roar's page on the KCLSU website

King's College London
Student newspapers published in the United Kingdom
Publications established in 1973
Monthly newspapers
London newspapers